is a former Japanese football player.

Playing career
Sakoi was born in Hiroshima Prefecture on May 8, 1977. After graduating from Juntendo University, he joined newly was promoted to J1 League club, FC Tokyo in 2000. He played several matches as defensive midfielder in first season. However he could not play at all in the match in 2001. In July 2001, he moved to J2 League club Yokohama FC on loan. He became a regular player as center back immediately and played many matches until 2002. In 2003, he returned to FC Tokyo. However he could not play at all in the match. In 2004, he moved to J2 club Montedio Yamagata on loan. He became a regular player as right side back from summer. In 2005, he returned to FC Tokyo. Although he played several matches, he could hardly play in the match and retired end of 2005 season.

Club statistics

References

External links

1977 births
Living people
Juntendo University alumni
Association football people from Hiroshima Prefecture
Japanese footballers
J1 League players
J2 League players
FC Tokyo players
Yokohama FC players
Montedio Yamagata players
Association football defenders